The 1977 World Short Track Speed Skating Championships were the second championships and took place between April 15 and 17, 1977, in Grenoble, France.

Results

Men

Women

Medal table

Participating nations

External links
 Shorttrackonline.info Results

World Short Track Speed Skating Championships
World Championships
International speed skating competitions hosted by France
World Short Track Speed Skating Championships
World Short Track Speed Skating Championships
World Short Track Speed Skating Championships, 1977